Gabrielle Lazure (born 28 April 1957) is an American-Canadian actress. She has appeared in more than sixty films since 1981.

Selected filmography

References

External links
 

1957 births
Living people
Actresses from Philadelphia
Canadian film actresses
Canadian television actresses
20th-century Canadian actresses
21st-century Canadian actresses
21st-century American women